United Arab Emirates competed at the 2015 World Aquatics Championships in Kazan, Russia from 24 July to 9 August 2015.

Open water swimming

United Arab Emirates has qualified one swimmer to compete in the open water marathon.

Swimming

Emirati swimmers have achieved qualifying standards in the following events (up to a maximum of 2 swimmers in each event at the A-standard entry time, and 1 at the B-standard):

Men

Women

References

External links
UAE Swimming Federation

Nations at the 2015 World Aquatics Championships
2015 in Emirati sport
United Arab Emirates at the World Aquatics Championships